Faratsiho is a town in Vakinankaratra Region, Madagascar. It is the capitol of the Faratsiho District.
It has a population of 46,569 with 93% of farmers. Being located at an altitude of 1720m it is the highest city in Madagascar.

It is located on the RN 43 from Ambohibary - Faratsiho - Soavinandriana.

Faratsihite, a mineral had been named by the town.

Rivers
3 rivers cross the municipality of Faratsiho: Kitsamby, Sahomby and the Mahasetroka river.

Nature
Faratsiho Natural Park

References

Populated places in Vakinankaratra